The Amola-Faca River is a river of Santa Catarina state in southeastern Brazil. It joins with the Da Pedra River to form the Itoupava River.

See also
List of rivers of Santa Catarina

References

Rivers of Santa Catarina (state)